The 1995 ATP Tour World Championships (also known for the singles event as the IBM-ATP Tour World Championship for sponsorship reasons) were tennis tournaments played on indoor carpet courts. The event marked the 26th edition of the year-end singles championships and the 22nd edition of the year-end doubles championships, where both were part of the 1995 ATP Tour. The singles event took place at the Frankfurt Festhalle in Frankfurt, Germany, from November 14 to November 19, 1995, and the doubles event in Eindhoven, Netherlands, from November 22 to November 26, 1995.

Champions

Singles

 Boris Becker defeated  Michael Chang, 7–6(7–3), 6–0, 7–6(7–5)
 It was Becker's 2nd title of the year, and his 44th overall. It was his 3rd year-end championships title.

Doubles

 Grant Connell /  Patrick Galbraith defeated  Jacco Eltingh /  Paul Haarhuis, 7–6(8–6), 7–6(8–6), 3–6, 7–6(7–2).

External links
Official website
Singles draw
Doubles draw

 
ATP Tour World Championships
1995
Tennis tournaments in Germany
Tennis tournaments in the Netherlands
ATP Tour World Championships
Sports competitions in Frankfurt
ATP Tour World Championships
Sports competitions in Eindhoven
20th century in Eindhoven
ATP Tour World Championships
1990s in Frankfurt